Thryptomene strongylophylla is a shrub species in the family Myrtaceae that is endemic to Western Australia.

It blooms between May and November producing pink-purple flowers.

It is found on sand plains and sand dunes in the Wheatbelt, Mid West and Gascoyne regions of Western Australia between Shark Bay and Carnamah where it grows in sandy soils.

References

strongylophylla
Endemic flora of Western Australia
Rosids of Western Australia
Taxa named by George Bentham
Plants described in 1867